Lakoba (Abkhaz or Russian: Лакоба) is an Abkhaz surname. Notable people with the surname include:

Iakub Lakoba, Abkhaz politician
Nestor Lakoba (1893–1936), Abkhaz Communist leader
Sariya Lakoba (1904–1939), wife of Nestor
Stanislav Lakoba (born 1953), Abkhaz academic and politician